Thomas Francis Gormley (August 9, 1891 – July 24, 1951) was an American football player and coach. He played in the American Professional Football League (AFPL)—now known as National Football League (NFL)—with the Canton Bulldogs, Cleveland Tigers, Washington Senators and the New York Brickley Giants. Brickley's New York Giants are not related to the modern-day New York Giants. He also played for the independent Youngstown Patricians from 1917 until 1919.

Gormley played college football at Catholic University of America, Georgetown University, Ursinus College and Villanova University. He later became the head coach of the Catholic Cardinals football team.

He was buried in Arlington National Cemetery.

References

1891 births
1951 deaths
American football guards
American football tackles
Canton Bulldogs players
Cleveland Tigers (NFL) players
Catholic University Cardinals football coaches
Catholic University Cardinals football players
Georgetown Hoyas football players
New York Brickley Giants players
Villanova Wildcats football players
Washington Senators (NFL) players
Youngstown Patricians players
Sportspeople from Bridgeport, Connecticut
Coaches of American football from Connecticut
Players of American football from Connecticut
Burials at Arlington National Cemetery